McVicar is the soundtrack to the film McVicar and the fourth solo studio album by Roger Daltrey, the lead vocalist for The Who. The film, a biopic of the English bank robber John McVicar, was produced by Daltrey and also featured him in the starring role as John McVicar himself. Because all of the then-members of The Who played on the album, it is often considered to be an unrecognized Who album although there was no participation by the band in the songwriting.

The album was released in June 1980, on Polydor PD-1-6284 in the US. It was produced by Jeff Wayne and recorded at Advision Studios, London. Daltrey's vocals were recorded at Air Studios, Montserrat, West Indies. The album reached number 22 in the US and produced Daltrey's highest charting solo single to date, "Without Your Love".

In 2001 Swedish HipHop group Infinite Mass used Daltrey's song "My Time is Gonna Come" (as well as the bass line in the song) for their International hit "Bullet". The music video for "Bullet" composites clips from the film McVicar with new footage.

Track listing

Singles chart positions 
 "Free Me", #53
 "Waiting for a Friend", #104
 "Without Your Love", #20

Personnel 
 Roger Daltrey - vocals
 Pete Townshend - guitar
 Ricky Hitchcock - guitar
 Billy Nicholls - guitar
 Jo Partridge - slide, electric & acoustic guitars
 John Entwistle - bass
 Herbie Flowers - bass
 Dave Markee - bass
 John "Rabbit" Bundrick - keyboards
 Ken Freeman - synthesizers, keyboards
 Ron Aspery - flute
Jeff Wayne, Steve Bray - brass arrangements
 Kenney Jones - drums
 Dave Mattacks - drums
 Stuart Elliott - drums
 Frank Ricotti - percussion
 Tony Carr - percussion

Technical
 Jon Walls - engineer, AIR Studios, Montserrat
Cy Langston, Geoff Young, Laurence Diana - engineer
Richard Evans - sleeve design
David James - photography

See also 
Roger Daltrey discography

References

External links 
 

1980 albums
Roger Daltrey albums
Polydor Records soundtracks
Albums recorded at AIR Studios